Ted Nebbeling (1944 – October 28, 2009) was a British Columbia Legislative Assembly Member and Minister of State for the Community Charter from 2001 to 2004.

Marriage
He married Jan Holmberg, his partner of 32 years, on November 15, 2003, in one of the world's first same-sex weddings of a serving cabinet minister. The day after his marriage was announced in the media, Nebbeling was dropped from cabinet in a shuffle. The government stated that the timing was coincidental and that there was no prejudicial motive behind this, as Nebbeling was openly gay at the time of his election. Nebbeling and Holmberg were both immigrants to Canada, Nebbeling from the Netherlands and Holmberg from Sweden. Nebbeling came to Canada in 1977 and became a Canadian citizen in 1980.

Earlier years
Before becoming an MLA in 1996, Nebbeling was mayor and city councillor of Whistler, British Columbia. In January 2005, Nebbeling announced that he would not seek re-election to the Legislative Assembly.

Death
Ted Nebbeling died of colon cancer on October 28, 2009, aged 65.

References

External links
 Legislative Assembly Biography

1944 births
2009 deaths
British Columbia Liberal Party MLAs
Deaths from cancer in British Columbia
Date of birth missing
Deaths from colorectal cancer
Dutch emigrants to Canada
Gay politicians
LGBT mayors of places in Canada
Canadian LGBT people in provincial and territorial legislatures
Mayors of places in British Columbia
21st-century Canadian politicians
20th-century Canadian LGBT people
Canadian gay men
20th-century Canadian politicians
21st-century Canadian LGBT people